Ferencvárosi Torna Club is a water polo club from Budapest, Hungary. The team competes in the Országos Bajnokság I.

Naming history
 Ferencvárosi Torna Club (FTC): (1899 – 1949)
 ÉDOSZ SE: (1950 – 1956)
 Budapesti Kinizsi (Bp. Kinizsi): (1951 – 1956)
 Ferencvárosi TC: (1957–1988/89)
 FTC-Törley: (1989/90 – 1992/93) - the first naming sponsor of FTC
 Ferencvárosi TC: (1993/94)
 FTC-Vitasport: (1994/95 – 1995/96)
 FTC-Vitalin: (1996/97 – 1998/99)
 FTC-Thomas Jeans: (1999/00)
 FTC-Mirato: (2000/01)
 FTC-VMAX: (2001/02 – 2002/03)
 Jégcsillag-FTC: (2003/04)
 Betonút-FTC: (2004/05 – 2005/06)
 FTC-Aprilia: (2006/07 – 2008/09)
 FTC-Fisher Klíma: (2008/09 – 2011/12)
 Széchenyi Bank-FTC: (2012/13 – 2013/14)
 Ferencvárosi TC: (2014/15)
 FTC-PQS Waterpolo: (2015/16 – 2019/20)
 FTC-Telekom (2020/21 – ... )

Honours

Domestic competitions 
Országos Bajnokság I (National Championship of Hungary)
 Champions (24): 1910, 1911, 1912, 1913, 1918, 1919, 1920, 1921, 1922, 1925, 1926, 1927, 1944, 1956, 1962, 1963, 1965, 1968, 1987–88, 1989–90, 1999–00, 2017–18, 2018–19, 2021–22 

Magyar Kupa (National Cup of Hungary)
 Winners (21): 1923, 1924, 1926, 1949, 1957, 1962, 1964, 1965, 1967, 1969, 1973, 1976, 1977, 1978, 1988–89, 1989–90, 1996, 2018, 2019, 2020, 2021

European competitions 
LEN Champions League (Champions Cup)
Winners (1): 2018–19
Runners-up (1): 2020–21 Semi-finalist (1): 1988–89

LEN Euro Cup
Winners (2): 2016–17, 2017–18

LEN Cup Winners' Cup
Winners (4) – record: 1974–75, 1977–78, 1979–80, 1997–98

LEN Super Cup
Winners (4): 1978, 1980, 2018, 2019 

 International record 

Current squad
Season 2021–22

Staff

Transfers 

 In:

 Out:

Recent seasons

 Cancelled due to the COVID-19 pandemic in Hungary.

In European competition
Participations in Champions League (Champions Cup, Euroleague): 9x
Participations in Euro Cup (LEN Cup): 11x
Participations in Cup Winners' Cup: 5x

Notable former players

Olympic champions
György Kárpáti – 24 years (1945-1969)  1952 Helsinki, 1956 Melbourne, 1964 Tokyo
László Felkai – 19 years (1950-1969)  1964 Tokyo
György Gerendás – 18 years (1959-1977)  1976 Montreal
István Molnár – 12 years (1932-1944)  1936 Berlin
Miklós Ambrus – 12 years (1953-1956, 1959-1968)  1964 Tokyo
Norbert Hosnyánszky – 9 years (1994-2003)  2008 Beijing
Alajos Keserű – 8 years (1920-1928)  1932 Los Angeles
József Vértesy – 8 years (1920-1928)  1932 Los Angeles
Bulcsú Székely – 8 years (1996-2001, 2002-2004, 2011-2012)  2000 Sydney
Dr. István Szívós – 7 years (1960-1967)  1976 Montreal
Barnabás Steinmetz – 7 years (1993-1995, 1996-2000, 2009-2010)  2000 Sydney, 2004 Athens
Dezső Gyarmati – 6 years (1960-1966)  1952 Helsinki, 1956 Melbourne, 1964 Tokyo
Károly Szittya – 5 years (1949-1954)  1952 Helsinki
Antal Bolvári – 5 years (1964-1969)  1952 Helsinki, 1956 Melbourne
János Németh – 4 years (1941-1945)  1932 Los Angeles
Dezső Fábián – 4 years (1948-1952)  1952 Helsinki
Ádám Steinmetz – 4 years (1996-2000)  2004 Sydney
Zoltán Kósz – 3 years (1998-2001)  2000 Sydney
 Stefan Mitrović – 3 years (2016–2019)  2016 Rio de JaneiroLászló Jeney – 2 years (1956-1958)  1952 Helsinki, 1956 Melbourne
Rajmund Fodor – 2 years (1996-1997, 1998-1999)  2000 Sydney, 2004 Athens
Zsolt Varga – 2 years (2010-2012)  2000 Sydney
Norbert Madaras  – 2 years (2016–2018) 2004 Athens, 2008 Beijing
Dániel Varga – 2 years (2016–2018)  2008 Beijing
 Slobodan Nikić – 2 years (2017–2019)  2016 Rio de Janeiro
 Nikola Jakšić – 2 years (2017–)  2016 Rio de Janeiro
Dénes Varga – 2 years (2017–)  2008 Beijing
Tamás Kásás – 1 year (1994-1995)  2000 Sydney, 2004 Athens, 2008 Beijing
Gergely Kiss – 1 year (1996-1997)  2000 Sydney, 2004 Athens, 2008 Beijing
Zoltán Szécsi – 1 year (2005-2006)  2000 Sydney, 2004 Athens, 2008 Beijing
 Branislav Mitrović – 1 year (2010-2011)  2016 Rio de Janeiro
Tamás Varga – 1 year (2010-2011)  2004 Athens, 2008 Beijing
 Gojko Pijetlović – 1 year (2012-2013)  2016 Rio de Janeiro
Kálmán Markovits – junior years  1952 Helsinki, 1956 Melbourne

Former coaches

 Dezső Fábián (1960–66)
 Dezső Gyarmati (1967–69)
 Mihály Mayer (1975–80)
 László Felkai (1981–82)
 István Szívós (1983–90)
 Mihály Mayer (1990–92) 
 Zoltán Kásás (1992–94)
 Péter Wolf (1994–95)
 Zoltán Kásás (1995) 
 Gábor Godova 
 Lajos Vad ( –2001)
 András Gyöngyösi (2001–03)
 Gábor Csapó (2003–04)
 Attila Bíró
 József Somossy (2006–09)
 Gábor Godova (2009–10) 
 Tamás Ambrus (2010–13)
 Zsolt Varga (2013– present'')

References

External links
 
 

Water polo
Sport in Budapest
Water polo clubs in Hungary